The Mre11 family of enzymes includes:

 MRE11A in humans
 The Mre11 in Pyrococcus furiosus - see Pyrococcus furiosus § Mre11